Colombia Móvil S.A., marketed under tigo trademark (formerly OLA), is the third largest mobile phone company in Colombia. It is headquartered in Bogotá, D.C.

Mobile phone companies of Colombia
Telecommunications companies established in 2002
Colombian companies established in 2002